Lenck is a surname of German origin. Notable people with the surname include:

 Georg Lenck (1685–1744), German musician
 Julius Lenck (1845–1901), Hungarian-German brewer and businessman
 Walter Lenck (1873–1952), German artist 

Surnames of German origin